Victoria Hübler (born 28 November 1994 in Vienna) is an Austrian figure skater. She represented Austria at two World Junior Championships.

Programs

Competitive highlights 
CS: Challenger Series; JGP: Junior Grand Prix

References

External links 
 

1994 births
Austrian female single skaters
Living people
Figure skaters from Vienna